Weekly is an English-language national news magazine published by the La Sentinelle Group in Mauritius. The magazine, which only exists on paper and direct-email PDF, has a relatively low readership, but is considered one of the most important sources of political news on the island. The magazine is known both for its news reporting, as well as its critical and often mocking editorials.

History and profile
It was started as a weekly section, named Outlook, of L'Express newspaper. It became a weekly magazine in July 2012. The magazine is published on Fridays. The editor-in-chief, Touria Prayag, was temporarily banned from Mauritian Parliament in 2016 by its speaker, Maya Hanoomanjee, because of a critical editorial published in Weekly on 28 April 2016.

References

Mass media in Mauritius
News magazines published in Africa
Weekly magazines
2012 establishments in Mauritius
Magazines established in 2012
English-language magazines